The 1999 Aberdeen City Council election took place on 6 May 1999 to elect members of Aberdeen City Council. This election was held on the same day as other Scottish local government elections and the first Scottish Parliament Election.

The results saw Labour retain its control of the council, albeit with a reduced majority.

Election results

Ward results

References

1999
1999 Scottish local elections
20th century in Aberdeen